Daggett is an unincorporated community in Jefferson Township, Owen County, in the U.S. state of Indiana.

History
Daggett was laid out in 1880. The community was named for Charles Daggett, the owner of a saw mill which was the center of the town's industry.

A post office was established at Daggett in 1880, and remained in operation until it was discontinued in 1896.

Geography

References

Unincorporated communities in Owen County, Indiana
Unincorporated communities in Indiana